Shasheen Fernando (born 1 January 1994) is a Sri Lankan cricketer. He made his first-class debut for Panadura Sports Club in the 2013–14 Premier Trophy on 17 January 2014.

See also
 List of Chilaw Marians Cricket Club players

References

External links
 

1994 births
Living people
Sri Lankan cricketers
Chilaw Marians Cricket Club cricketers
Panadura Sports Club cricketers
Ratnapura District cricketers
Cricketers from Colombo